Nuno Miguel Figueiredo Afonso (born 6 October 1974) is a Portuguese former footballer who played as a central defender.

Club career
Afonso was born in Oeiras, Lisbon metropolitan area. During his professional career, he represented S.L. Benfica (being part of the squad that won the Primeira Liga title), C.F. Os Belenenses, S.C. Campomaiorense, Vitória de Setúbal, C.S. Marítimo (two spells), F.C. Paços de Ferreira, C.D. Aves and U.D. Oliveirense, having abroad stints with UD Salamanca – contributing with only 157 minutes to a 1997 second division promotion – and CD Díter Zafra (also in Spain), retiring at only 28.

In his country's top level, Afonso amassed totals of 88 games and one goal over seven seasons.

International career
Afonso was a member of the Portuguese team that reached fourth place at the 1996 Summer Olympics in Atlanta, Georgia. He also represented the nation at the 1993 FIFA World Youth Championship in Australia, in an eventual group stage exit following three losses.

References

External links

1974 births
Living people
People from Oeiras, Portugal
Portuguese footballers
Association football defenders
Primeira Liga players
Liga Portugal 2 players
Segunda Divisão players
S.L. Benfica footballers
C.F. Os Belenenses players
S.C. Campomaiorense players
Vitória F.C. players
C.S. Marítimo players
F.C. Paços de Ferreira players
C.D. Aves players
U.D. Oliveirense players
Segunda División players
Segunda División B players
UD Salamanca players
Portugal youth international footballers
Portugal under-21 international footballers
Olympic footballers of Portugal
Footballers at the 1996 Summer Olympics
Portuguese expatriate footballers
Expatriate footballers in Spain
Portuguese expatriate sportspeople in Spain
Sportspeople from Lisbon District